Patrick Kpozo (born 15 July 1997) is a Ghanaian professional footballer who plays for FC Sheriff Tiraspol as a defender.

Club career
Kpozo made his professional debut for AIK in a Svenska Cupen match against Ekerö IK in 2015.

On 28 March 2017, Kpozo joined Tromsø on loan until the summer.

On 17 January 2022, Sheriff Tiraspol announced the signing of Kpozo.

International career 
On 9 March 2023, Kpozo received his first call-up to the Ghana senior national team by head coach Chris Hughton for two qualifiers for the 2023 Africa Cup of Nations against Angola.

Career statistics

References

1997 births
Living people
Ghanaian footballers
Ghana under-20 international footballers
Ghanaian expatriate footballers
Allsvenskan players
Ettan Fotboll players
Eliteserien players
Moldovan Super Liga players
AIK Fotboll players
Tromsø IL players
Östersunds FK players
FC Sheriff Tiraspol players
Ghanaian expatriate sportspeople in Sweden
Expatriate footballers in Sweden
Expatriate footballers in Norway
Expatriate footballers in Moldova
Association football defenders
Footballers from Accra